Bandish is a Pakistani romantic drama Urdu film released in 1980. It was directed by Nazar-ul-Islam and the top cast included Shabnam, Nadeem, and Diana Christina. Bandish was shot in Pakistan and Indonesia. The film was a commercial success and won 7 Nigar Awards in different categories. The movie songs, "Sona na chandi na koi mehal" and "Do piyasay dil ek hue hein" became the most iconic melodies of the era.

Plot
The central idea of Bandish was taken from the Hollywood film Random Harvest (1942). The story is about a married Pakistani man who is a son of an industrialist and husband of a loving wife. He goes on a business trip to Indonesia. There he receives a head injury in a boat accident. Though he survives the accident and reaches ashore on an island but due to the trauma, he now experiences amnesia, forgetting his personal identity and his family back in Pakistan. On the island, he meets an Indonesian girl who takes him to her home and takes care of him. Days pass by and the Indonesian girl starts learning his language, Urdu. Meanwhile, his wife starts tracking him and finally finds him. Then a drama occurs between the three characters; a man with lost memory, a worried wife, and a girl in love with a foreigner.

Cast and crew
 Cast:	Shabnam, Nadeem, Dana Christina (from Indonesia), Roy Marten, Agha Talish, Allauddin, Talat Hussain (guest)
 Director:	Nazar-ul-Islam
 Producer: Ahmad Shamsi
 Screenwriter: Bashir Niaz
 Musician:	Robin Ghosh
 Lyricists:	Taslim Fazli, Saeed Gilani, Riaz ur Rehman Saghar
 Playback singers:	Mehnaz, Nayyara Noor, Mehdi Hassan, Akhlaq Ahmed, A. Nayyar
 Cameraman:	Riaz Bukhari
 Cinematographer: 	Kamran Mirza

Music and soundtracks
The music of Bandish was composed by Robin Ghosh and it was one of the strongest points of the film. The soundtracks became very popular:
 	
 Do Pyasay Dil Eik Huway Hayn Kaisay... Singers: Mehdi Hassan, Mehnaz, Poet: Taslim Fazli
  	Achha Achha Laago Ray... Singers: Nayyara Noor, A Nayyar, Poet: Riaz ur Rehman Saghar
  	Hello Hello Saing... Singers: Nayyara Noor, A Nayyar, Poet: Taslim Fazli 	
   Sona Na Chandi Na Koi Mahal Jan-e-Mann... Singer: Akhlaq Ahmed, Poet: Saeed Gilani
  	Tujhay Dil Say Laga Loun Palkon Mein Chhupa Loun... Singers: Mehnaz & Co., Poet: Taslim Fazli

Reception and reviews
Bandish did well at the box office and completed 88 weeks in theaters. The film received very positive reviews from cinema fans and the critics. Due to the Indonesian actress Diana Kristina, Bandish also got attention in Indonesia.

Awards
Bandish won 7 Nigar Awards in the following categories:
 Best supporting actor: 	Allauddin 		
 Best lyricist: 	Tasleem Fazli 	
 Best cinematographer: 	Kamran Mirza 	
 Best playback female singer: 	Mehnaz 	
 Best playback male singer: 	Akhlaq Ahmed 	
 Best film editor: 	K.D. Mirza 	
 Special award: 	Diana Kristina

References

1980 films
1980 multilingual films
Films shot in Indonesia
Indonesian multilingual films
Pakistani multilingual films
Pakistani musical films
1980s Indonesian-language films
1980s Urdu-language films
Nigar Award winners
Films scored by Robin Ghosh
1980 romantic drama films
Pakistani romantic drama films
Urdu-language Pakistani films